Satyrus is a genus of butterflies from the subfamily Satyrinae in the family Nymphalidae. The genus was erected by Pierre André Latreille in 1810. The species in the genus Satyrus occur in Europe and North Africa.

Species
Satyrus actaea (Esper, 1780)
Satyrus ferula (Fabricius, 1793)
Satyrus stheno Grum-Grshimailo, 1887
Satyrus virbius Herrich-Schäffer, 1843
Satyrus amasinus Staudinger, 1861
Satyrus iranicus Schwingenschuss, 1939
Satyrus effendi Nekrutenko, 1989
Satyrus daubi Gross & Ebert, 1975
Satyrus nana Staudinger, 1886
Satyrus pimpla C. Felder & R. Felder, 1867
Satyrus orphei Schchetkin, 1985
Satyrus favonius Staudinger, 1892
Satyrus parthicus Lederer, 1869

References

Satyrini
Butterfly genera
Taxa named by Pierre André Latreille